The 2018 ACC Championship Game was played on December 1, 2018. It was the 14th annual ACC Championship Game, played to determine the 2018 champion of the Atlantic Coast Conference. The game was held at Bank of America Stadium in Charlotte, North Carolina.  Clemson emerged victorious and became the 2018 ACC champions, beating Pitt 42–10.

History
The 2018 Championship Game was the 14th in the Atlantic Coast Conference's 66-year history. Last season, the ACC Championship Game featured the Clemson Tigers, champions of the Atlantic Division, and the Miami Hurricanes, champions of the Coastal Division. Clemson won the game 38–3 and went on to the 2017 College Football Playoff.

Teams

Clemson

The Clemson Tigers finished the season with a 12–0 undefeated record. This is the Tigers' fourth straight appearance in the championship game. They have won the previous three championship games. During the season, they defeated Georgia Tech, Syracuse, Wake Forest, NC State, Florida State, Louisville, Boston College and Duke in conference play. Their season was also highlighted by 2 wins over SEC teams (Texas A&M and South Carolina). The Tigers come into the game ranked #2 in both the AP and Coaches poll.

Pittsburgh

The Pittsburgh Panthers finished the season with a 7–5 overall record and a 6–2 record in ACC play. This is Pitt's first appearance in the championship game. During the regular season, they defeated Georgia Tech, Syracuse, Duke, Virginia, Virginia Tech, and Wake Forest in conference play. They lost to North Carolina and Miami (FL) in conference play. The Panthers come into the game unranked in both the AP and Coaches poll.

Clemson vs. Pittsburgh series history
This matchup was the third all-time meeting between the Tigers and Panthers. They last played on November 12, 2016, when Pitt upset No. 2 Clemson at Memorial Stadium, kicking the winning field goal with 6 seconds remaining to defeat Clemson by a final score of 43–42. The win brought Clemson its first (and ultimately, only) loss of the season, as the Tigers went on to win the College Football Playoff National Championship.

Game summary

Scoring summary

Statistics

References

Championship
ACC Championship Game
Clemson Tigers football games
Pittsburgh Panthers football games
December 2018 sports events in the United States
ACC Championship Game